Lungo (Italian for "long") is a coffee beverage made by using an espresso machine to make an Italian-style coffee – short black (a single espresso shot) with more water (generally twice as much), resulting in a larger coffee, a lungo.

A normal serving of espresso takes from 18 to 30 seconds to pull, and fills 25 to 60 millilitres, while a lungo may take up to a minute to pull, and might fill 130 to 170 millilitres. Extraction time of the dose is determined by the variety of coffee beans (usually a blend of Arabica and Robusta), their grind and the pressure of the machine. It is usually brewed using an espresso machine but with two or three times the amount of water to the same weight of coffee to make a much longer drink. 

In French it is called .

Related beverages 
A caffè lungo should not be mistaken for a caffè americano (an espresso with hot water added to it) or a long black (hot water with a short black added to it, which is the inverse order to an Americano and done to preserve the crema).

In the lungo, all the water is brewed, and the lungo is generally shorter than an Americano or a long black.

In comparison, the caffè crema is a significantly longer drink, comparable in size to an Americano or long black. (This drink is rare in the English-speaking world.) Like the lungo, it is all brewed water, but is about twice as long as a lungo.

Flavour 
As the amount of water is increased or decreased relative to a normal shot, the composition of the shot changes due to the fact that the flavour components of coffee dissolve at varying rates. For this reason, a long or short shot will not contain the same ratio of components that a normal shot contains. Therefore, a ristretto is not simply twice as "strong" as a regular shot, nor is a lungo simply half the strength. Moreover, since espresso is brewed under pressure, a lungo does not have the same taste or composition as coffee produced by other methods, even when made with the same ratio of water and ground coffee.

Brewing 
Ristretto, normale, and lungo are relative terms without exact measurements. Nevertheless, a rough guide is a brewing ratio grounds-to-liquid of 1:1 for ristretto, 1:2 for normale, and 1:3–1:4 for lungo. Assuming a 30g dose of ground coffee, a ristretto solo is thus 30 ml (1 fl oz) (the foamy crema slightly increases this volume), normale is 60 ml (2 fl oz), and lungo is 90–120 ml (3–4 fl oz). By contrast, a caffè crema will be approximately 180 ml (6 fl oz).

See also

 Americano (coffee) – hot water added to espresso (in that order)
 Caffè crema
 List of coffee beverages
 Long black – espresso added to hot water (in that order); famous in Australia
 Ristretto – half-length extraction; the opposite of a lungo

References

Coffee in Italy
Espresso drinks